Ali Miri  (born 1 August 1995) is an Iranian weightlifter who won a silver medal at the 2019 Ningbo Asian championship.

Major results

References

External links
 
 
 

1995 births
Living people
Iranian male weightlifters
World Weightlifting Championships medalists
21st-century Iranian people